Harold Watson Neale (born March 9, 1937) is a Canadian retired NCAA, NHL and WHA coach and general manager, and ice hockey broadcaster.

Coaching career
Following his playing career, Neale got his head coaching start at Hill Park Secondary School in Hamilton, Ontario, where he also taught social studies and physical education.

In 1966, he replaced Glen Sonmor at Ohio State University. While at Ohio State, he was a physical fitness trainer for the Ohio State football team. He coached the Buckeyes for four seasons compiling a 49-48-3 record. He left Ohio State in 1970 to coach junior hockey in Hamilton.

Neale was hired as assistant coach of the Minnesota Fighting Saints of the WHA in 1972. He replaced Sonmor again as head coach late in the 1972–73 season. He remained head coach until the Fighting Saints franchise folded during the 1975–76 season. Following Minnesota, Neale remained in the WHA as head coach of the New England Whalers for two seasons from 1976 to 1978. He coached the Whalers to the Avco Cup Finals where they lost to the Winnipeg Jets. Between stints at Minnesota and New England, Neale was an assistant coach for the U.S. team in the 1976 Canada Cup.

Hired by the Vancouver Canucks in 1978, Neale coached the Canucks for almost four seasons. Late in the 1981–82 season, Neale was involved in an altercation with fans during a game in Quebec City against the Nordiques and was suspended for ten games. Assistant coach Roger Neilson was promoted to interim coach during the suspension. When the Canucks lost only once in ten games, Neilson was given the job full-time as the team advanced to the 1982 Stanley Cup Finals. At season's end, Neale was promoted to general manager (an arrangement made prior to the suspension).

Neale returned to the Canucks bench in January 1984 after firing Neilson and again in November 1984 after firing Bill LaForge twenty games into the season. The Canucks fired Neale from his posts as vice-president, general manager, and head coach in April 1985.

The Detroit Red Wings hired Neale prior to the 1985–86 season. However, after a poor start, Neale was fired after 35 games.

Head coaching record

College

WHA

NHL

Broadcast career
During his coaching and managerial career, he sometimes worked for Hockey Night in Canada as an analyst in the playoffs, in the event his team missed the playoffs or eliminated from Stanley Cup contention. He then began working as a broadcaster full-time in 1986. That year, he was first teamed with play-by-play man Bob Cole on CBC. Together, the pair broadcast 20 Stanley Cup Finals. In the playoffs, when Cole was working with other color commentators, he also worked with Don Wittman, Chris Cuthbert, and Jim Hughson. During this time, he also provided colour commentary for locally televised Toronto Maple Leafs games. During his tenure, he was paired with play-by-play broadcasters Jim Hughson, Ken Daniels, Jiggs McDonald, and Joe Bowen. In addition, Neale occasionally worked on Edmonton Oilers and Calgary Flames broadcasts. He left the Toronto telecasts after the 2006–07 season to join the Buffalo Sabres broadcast team.

As a colour commentator, Neale has covered the 1998, 2002, and 2006 Winter Olympics and the 1996 World Cup of Hockey and 2004 for CBC. He is known for the same sense of humour he was famous for as a coach, often referring to the puck as "..bouncing like an Indian Rubber (lacrosse) ball", as well as for his estimations of exact distances on the ice.

Neale spent five seasons, from 2007–08 to 2011–12, as the colour commentator for the Buffalo Sabres serving alongside Rick Jeanneret, a personal friend of Neale's and fellow Foster Hewitt Memorial Award winner. He spent the 2012–13 season as a studio analyst for the Sabres' pregame show and intermission reports.

During the 2013–14 season, Neale served as colour commentator for Toronto Maple Leafs broadcasts on Leafs TV. He retired at the end of the 2013–14 season.

On March 25, 2022 Neale served as colour commentator for the Buffalo Sabres , once again alongside Rick Jeanneret in a guest appearance, for a game involving the Buffalo Sabres and Washington Capitals during the first and second periods.

Honours
In 2010, he was elected as an inaugural inductee into the World Hockey Association Hall of Fame in the coaching category.

In 2013, Neale received the Foster Hewitt Memorial Award and thus was honored by the Hockey Hall of Fame.

Personal life
Neale grew up in Sarnia, Ontario and moved to East Amherst, New York in 1987. He has five children.

References

 

1937 births
Living people
Buffalo Sabres announcers
Canadian ice hockey coaches
Canadian television sportscasters
Detroit Red Wings coaches
Edmonton Oilers announcers
Foster Hewitt Memorial Award winners
Ice hockey people from Ontario
Minnesota Fighting Saints coaches
National Hockey League broadcasters
New England Whalers coaches
Ohio State Buckeyes men's ice hockey coaches
Sportspeople from Sarnia
Toronto Maple Leafs announcers
Toronto Marlboros players
Vancouver Canucks coaches
Vancouver Canucks general managers
World Hockey Association coaches